Liem Tjeng Kiang, born around 1935,  is a former Indonesian badminton player active in the 1960s.

Profile
Liem Tjeng Kiang is an early generation badminton player in Indonesia, he is one of the players who managed to bring two medals at the  Asian Games 1962, namely gold in the men's team and silver in men's doubles in a tense match against the malaysian doubles as well as the 1962 Asian Championships, brought home two medals, namely silver in the men's team and bronze in the men's doubles.

Achievements

Asian Games 

Men's doubles

Asian Championships 

Men's doubles

References 

1935 births
Living people
Asian Games medalists in badminton
Badminton players at the 1962 Asian Games
Asian Games gold medalists for Indonesia
Asian Games silver medalists for Indonesia
Medalists at the 1962 Asian Games
Indonesian male badminton players
Indonesian sportspeople of Chinese descent